This is a list of episodes for the Mushi-Shi anime series. It premiered in Japan on October 23, 2005, but after 20 episodes, the series went on hiatus and resumed screening the remaining six on May 15, 2006. A special episode aired on January 4, 2014. A second series, Mushi-Shi -Next Passage-, started airing on April 5, 2014. The first half of the second series ended on June 21, 2014. The remainder of the series aired during the fall, preceded by a special episode, "Path of Thorns", which covers the two-chapter final story of volume 7 of the manga. Another special episode, "Bell Droplets", based on the manga's last arc, was released theatrically on May 16, 2015.

Mushi-Shi is an anthology series, where each episode tells a self-contained story and is not dependent on prior episodes for background. This made it possible for the producers of the anime to change the relative order of the stories. Aside from a slight abridgement of the dialogue, this is the only major difference between the manga and the anime.

The first series features an opening theme song, "The Sore Feet Song" by Ally Kerr, and each episode features a different ending composed by Toshio Masuda. The opening song for the second season is "Shiver" by Lucy Rose.

Episode list

Mushi-Shi
{|class="wikitable" style="width:98%; margin:auto; background:#FFF;"
|- style="border-bottom: 3px solid #B30713;"
! style="width:12em;"  | No.
! style="text-align:left;" | Title
! style="width:12em;" | Original air date
|-

|}

Mushi-Shi -Next Passage-
{|class="wikitable" style="width:98%; margin:auto; background:#FFF;"
|- style="border-bottom: 3px solid #3CB371;"
! style="width:12em;"  | No.
! style="text-align:left;" | Title
! style="width:12em;" | Original air date
|-

|}

References

Mushishi